The 1991 United States Motorcycle Grand Prix was the third round of the 1991 FIM Grand Prix motorcycle roadracing season, held on the weekend of April 19–21, 1991 at Laguna Seca Raceway. This event featured no fewer than four American riders on competitive equipment, plus two more on B-level machines, during the era of U.S. domination.

500 cc race report
QUALIFYING -- Kevin Schwantz wasn't getting the drive he wanted out of the corners in practice on his Suzuki RGVr500. "Rear wheel grip is definitely our biggest shortcoming. We're trying different combinations of raising and lowering the front and rear ends of the bike," Schwantz commented. He ended third-fastest in qualifying, later joking: "'The easiest way to correct our problem is to steer the front wheel in the direction of the slide."

Australian Mick Doohan, Honda's number one man, encountered front-end difficulties while trying to secure a decent grid positive for the race. "I'll lay it in and it wants to run wide. I can't get it on a tight enough line," Doohan complained. Mick's race-day plan was to gear the machine down, so as to better allow the power of his NSR500 to turn the bike by drifting the rear Michelin. 

Four-time World Champion Eddie Lawson told reporters he was spending a lot of time supporting his Cagiva on his knee because his front end was pushing fairly often. Lawson continued to adjust settings and qualified his Italian machine just behind Doohan.

Keen attention was paid to reigning 250cc champion John Kocinski, who was race-favorite Wayne Rainey's new teammate on a 500 at Marlboro Roberts Yamaha. He hustled his bike around Laguna less than one-tenth of a second slower than Rainey in practice. "The knowledge of riding the 250 doesn't pertain to riding a 500 - it's a totally different animal," explained Kocinski. "You've got a lot more braking to worry about and the acceleration areas are a lot different. You've got a slower apex speed, a much faster exit and a faster entrance too, so everything's got to change." Kocinski's fourth and third place finishes in the opening races of the season indicated that he wouldn't have much trouble transitioning to the more powerful machine, though. And like Rainey, he considered Laguna his domain.

As expected, Rainey qualified ahead of Kocinski on pole position. "You've got to attack this race track. Bike set-up is critical here and some of the other guys had problems," Rainey observed. Less than one second covered 1st through 5th places on the starting grid. 

RACE -- For the main event Schwantz donned an Arai helmet custom painted in army camouflage as his personal tribute to the U.S. troops who risked their lives for operation Desert Storm. The rear of the helmet featured a caricature nicknaming him "Stormin' Kevin Schwantzkopf” in a nod to American general Norman Schwarzkopf. 

After the green light Schwantz and Rainey touched going over the turn one crest. Schwantz dove into the turn two hairpin first, followed closely by Rainey and Doohan. Rainey slipped inside Schwantz at the entrance to turn three. Schwantz changed his line to put the Suzuki side-by-side with Rainey heading toward turn four but Wayne had already begun to stretch a lead as they powered through the infield. Through the Corkscrew the order was Rainey, Schwantz, Doohan, Kocinski, Lawson and Wayne Gardner. Doohan had a problem coming down the hill and lost a few places. One lap later Rainey set the fastest time of the race, working his Dunlop tires to the limit, getting sideways out of the turn two, and pulling away steadily.

Kocinski soon settled down to low 1:27 times that rivaled his teammate's but didn't get by Schwantz into second place until the end of lap 5, squeezing him out on the brakes going into the turn eleven kink before the front straight. Two laps later, perhaps a bit too eager to close the gap to Rainey, Kocinski highsided out of the hairpin. Unhurt, he attempted to rejoin the race. "I got it started again but it didn't sound too good," Kocinski lamented. “I think it may have got some dirt in the motor so there was no use going on."

Schwantz inherited second place with Mick Doohan snapping at his heels after recovering from his miserable first lap. Doohan's Michelins began spinning on lap 4, so his lines were quite different from Schwantz's, who was great on the brakes but still had no drive.

“It was obvious that I was slowing him down," Schwantz said later. "Every time I looked back I just saw a big number three, I couldn't see any sky or anything. I ran as fast as I could but when the front started chattering I had to let him by." Doohan took over second on lap 21. By this time Rainey had an insurmountable lead so Mick held his Honda steady in second with Schwantz bringing the Suzuki in a comfortable third.

The scrap for fourth place was lively as Jean-Philippe Ruggia, Gardner, Lawson, and his Cagiva teammate Alexandre Barros interchanged positions several times in a four-man freight train. Ruggia finally pulled ahead of the group with Lawson finishing fifth. Barros chased Lawson home, with Gardner charging across the line in seventh place after a brief off-track excursion in turn six where he had crashed twice before in the previous two years. Juan Garriga, Adrien Morillas, and Didier de Radiguès rounded out the top ten.

Salinas-native Doug Chandler parked his Roberts B-Team Yamaha early in the race due to mechanical problems.   

According to Michael Scott, Kocinski was so upset after his crash that he drove away from the track recklessly and refused to pull over when stopped by a policeman; he was arrested and sentenced to community service.

500 cc classification

250 cc classification

Sidecar classification

References

United States motorcycle Grand Prix
United States
United States Grand Prix
United States Grand Prix
Motorsport competitions in California